Champions League Super Strikes are football trading cards produced by Panini (stickers) for the football season 09/10. They are based upon the teams in the Champions League. Single packets of six cards retail for 50p in Britain, and a starter pack and tin are also available. In all there are 350 cards in the Super Strikes collection for the 09/10 season.

Super Strikes Update

On the 3 December, Panini announced the launch of Champions League Super Strikes Update, containing 150 new cards, featuring teams not available in the original collection, as well as new cards from teams already featuring.

Types of Cards
There are 5 types of cards in the Super Strikes collection. Firstly there are base cards, with no special appearance, Star Players, with a shiny foil look, Goal Stoppers with a similar face to that of the Star Players, Fans' Favourites, with a glossy background and Champions, the rarest type of cards with gold writing and a gloss background. Available with special products are Limited Editions.

External links
 Strikes Update Link 1 

Trading cards